Timniri is a rural commune in the Cercle of Bandigara of the Mopti Region of Mali. The commune contains 29 villages and in the 2009 census had a population of 20,637. The administrative centre (chef-lieu) is the village of Diangassagou.

References

External links
.
.

Communes of Mopti Region